Debi Pelletier is an American retired professional wrestler, better known by her ring name, The Killer Tomato.

Professional wrestling career

Early career (1983–1986) 
In 1983, Pelletier debuted as a professional wrestler using the ring name "The Killer Tomato". In her first match, she substituted for another female wrestler at a wrestling event held at the Olympic Auditorium.

Gorgeous Ladies of Wrestling (1986) 
Pelletier joined David McLane's Gorgeous Ladies of Wrestling promotion in 1986. She appeared as an on-screen character under the ring name "Dallas". Her character was similar to a Dallas Cowboys Cheerleader. She appeared during the first season.

American Wrestling Association (1986) 
After leaving GLOW, Pelletier joined the American Wrestling Association in 1986 under her Killer Tomato ring name and became a top contender for the AWA World Women's Championship, which was held by Sherri Martel. She also feuded with Martel in the California Championship Wrestling promotion in 1986.

Acting career 
In 1985, Pelleitier appeared in Grunt! The Wrestling Movie.
Pelletier also appeared in the movie The Bad Guys.
She had a speaking role in the TV series Hardcastle and McCormick.

In 2018, she starred on stage in AfterGLOW: The 80s Musical Experience with some of the original GLOW wrestlers: Matilda The Hun (Dee Booher), Roxy Astor (Tracee Meltzer), MTV (Eileen O’Hara), and Sunny the California Girl (Patricia Summerland).  In 2020, the show was nominated for 8 Broadway World Awards of the Decade and subsequently won 2 awards: Best Ensemble of the Decade and Director of a Musical of the Decade.

Championships and accomplishments 
Cauliflower Alley Club
Women's Wrestling (Retired) Award (2014)

References

External links 
 
 

American female professional wrestlers
Living people
Professional wrestlers from California
Year of birth missing (living people)
21st-century American women
20th-century professional wrestlers